Carmel College (Autonomous), Mala is an institution of higher education in Mala, Thrissr. College began in 1981 by sisters of congregation of Mother of Carmel, guided by their founders Saint Kuriakose Elias Chavara and Rev. Fr.Leopold Beccaro. It is affiliated to University of Calicut.

Accreditation and affiliation
Carmel College is accredited by National Accreditation and Assessment Council NAAC and affiliated to Calicut University.

Departments
 English
 Commerce
 Botany
 Mathematics
 Physics
 Zoology
 Chemistry
 History
 Political Science
 Sociology
 Business Administration
 Vocational Studies

Programmes
UG programmes
 B Sc Botany
 B Sc Chemistry
 B Sc Mathematics
 B Sc Applied Physics
 B A Sociology
 B A Functional English
 B A Political Science
 B Com Finance
 B Com Co-operation
 BBA
 B Voc Multimedia
 B Voc Software Development
 B Voc Agriculture
 B Voc Account and Taxation
 B Voc Banking Financial Services and Insurgence 
 B Voc Fashion Technology

PG programmes
 M A History
 M A Sociology
 M A English
 M Sc Botany
 M Sc Chemistry
 M Sc Mathematics
 M Com Finance
 M Voc Multimedia
 M Voc Software Development
Integrated Programmes

 Integrated MA Sociology (5 year)

Phd Programmes

 Botany

References

Universities and colleges in Thrissur district
Colleges affiliated with the University of Calicut